Katrina Copino Velarde (born December 5, 1994) is a Filipina singer and actress. She became part of the group New Born Divas that competed in the second season of Talentadong Pinoy. In 2012, she joined the first season of The X Factor Philippines and became part of the girl group A.K.A. J.A.M. under Gary Valenciano's team. She also finished as runner-up on TV5's Masked Singer Pilipinas as Diwata.

Katrina has often been referred to as "Asia's Vocal Supreme" as she represents the Philippines in the Firdaus Holiday Experience at Expo City Dubai last December 2022 with the Firdaus Orchestra together with other international artists. She performed her single "Isang Himala", the official soundtrack of the box office movie Miracle in Cell No. 7 (2019 Philippine film), "Hindi Tayo Pwede" from The Juans and "Pasko Na Sinta Ko" by Gary Valenciano.

Life and career
Born and raised in Tondo, Manila, Katrina started to join singing contest when she was 7 years old to help her family with their financial difficulties. She also sold Sampaguita lei that were made by her mother. Velarde was known as a veteran contender in some singing contest. She became part of Little Big Star hosted by Sarah Geronimo together with her batch mate Charice Pempengco and Sam Concepcion. Her biggest achievement was in 2006, when she won the title in Sonshine Radio's Survival Challenge, the biggest national singing competition on radio during its time. Katrina sang "One Moment in Time" by Whitney Houston as her winning piece. Morissette was also part of the competition.

2011: TV5's Talentadong Pinoy

Katrina together with her friends Alyssa Quijano and Jennifer Maravilla decided to form a group called "New Born Divas" to join the 2nd season of Talentadong Pinoy, one of the most popular reality talent searches during its time. After their group's consecutive winnings, they were named as the 11th Hall of Famer.

2012: ABS-CBN's The X Factor Philippines
After "New Born Divas" had disbanded, she joined The X Factor Philippines season 1 as a solo act. She sang "Dangerously in Love" by Beyoncé and got a four yeses from the judges. On her bootcamp performance, Velarde sang (You Make Me Feel Like) A Natural Woman by Aretha Franklin. After the day of that audition, the judges called the names of Katrina Velarde, Alyssa Quijano, Auriette Divina, Monique Lualhati, Jhelsea Flores and Ashley Campbell to inform them that they were chosen as the last act in groups category that made it to the Top 20 and it was mentored by Gary Valenciano. At the judges' home visit, A.K.A. J.A.M. performed Seasons of Love by the cast of Rent the musical and made it to the top 12. On the first week of their live show, their group performed the song Got to Be Real by Cheryl Lynn. On the second week, they performed This Is My Life (La vita) by Shirley Bassey. On the third week of their live show performance, A.K.A. J.A.M. performed Survivor by Destiny's Child. Unfortunately, their group didn't make it to the next level after losing to Daddy's Home via text votes of 4.42% and 5.53% respectively.

2013: Suklay Diva

After she uploaded a video of herself singing Dangerously In Love 2 by Beyoncé while holding a plastic comb as her microphone, netizens started calling her Suklay Diva (Comb Diva). It went viral after catching the attention of the netizens and started to gain international fame through social media. Her video went viral after Chris Brown and Beyoncé's guitarist Bibi McGill shared it on social media from worldstarhiphop.com and became a female talent of the week. Because of her viral video. Katrina Velarde got an invitation to showcase her talent on The Ellen DeGeneres Show. A segment that open its door for Filipino singer and internet sensation like Charice Pempengco. But due to her Bell's palsy condition, Katrina turned down the offer.

2014-2021: TV5 career

Velarde became part of TV5's weekly drama series "Trenderas" with Isabella de Leon and Lara Maigue where she played the role of Diva Salambangon. Her natural wit and sense of humor brought her to nomination at the 2015 Golden Screen Awards as Outstanding Breakthrough Performance by an Actress. In 2015, she also played a main role in TV5's Wattpad presents #Bitterella. Because of her passion in singing, she received a lot of opportunities that made her as one of the successful divas in her generation. Katrina had a chance to showcase her talent on Wish 107.5 Bus YouTube channel singing her rendition of Go The Distance by Michael Bolton and gained millions of views after a week. Because of her ability to imitate local and international singers, she started to upload a video of her song covers that became popular to some foreign reactors on YouTube.
 
In October 2018, Katrina performed in the 2018 Philippine Popular Music Festival, an annual songwriting competition organized by the Philpop MusicFest Foundation. She interpreted "Tama Na", an original song written by Michael Rodriguez & Jeanne Columbine Rodriguez which was chosen as one of the 10 finalists but the song did not place in the competition. Velarde sang theme songs for VIVA films "Magkaibang Mundo", the Original Sound Track of the movie Just A Stranger starring Anne Curtis and Marco Gumabao. Followed by "Isang Himala" from the box office movie Miracle in Cell No. 7 (2019 Philippine film) written by Miguel Mendoza.
 
In 2019, during the interview of Martin Nievera for his upcoming concert together with Lani Misalucha, he revealed that Katrina Velarde also offered to represent the Philippines to compete at The World's Best, a reality talent competition that features international performers. On the other hand, she declined the offer because she wanted to focus on her son that's why TNT Boys got into it. Katrina released her first album "Sikat Ako". The title of her album was based on her first solo major concert. Due to its success, it follows her 2nd major solo concert "SiKat i2".
 
She later joined Masked Singer Pilipinas 2020 as DIWATA where she became 1st runner up over Daryl Ong. Her successful journey from that contest made her as a judge on a reality singing competition Born to Be a Star.

2022-present: Asia's Vocal Supreme 

Katrina has often been referred to as "Asia's Vocal Supreme" as she represents the Philippines in the Firdaus Holiday Experience at Expo City Dubai last December 2022 with the Firdaus Orchestra together with other international artists. She performed her single "Isang Himala", the official soundtrack of the box office movie Miracle in Cell No. 7 (2019 Philippine film), "Hindi Tayo Pwede" from The Juans and "Pasko Na Sinta Ko" by Gary Valenciano.

Vocal Profile

Katrina Velarde is a Lyric Coloratura Soprano whose vocal range spans 5 octaves and a semitone, stretching from B♭2 to B7, with the exception of an exclaimed 8th octave note (C8). Classed as a Lyric Soprano, Katrina possesses a light voice accompanied by a mature and bright sounding timbre; together with a towering tessitura, this allows for her to be able to go as high as C6 (in mixed voice).  Her highest mixed note would not be a C6, but a semitone above, which is a C♯6.

Her lower register is rather impressive for such a soprano; she preserves consistency till E♭3/E3 and she is able to retain solid projection down to a C♯3. She is as well capable of sustaining a C3. 

Speaking of the head register, Katrina is very adept at it - she has a well-developed and strong head voice, with her highest note being a  G♯6. Similar to her head register, she has proved herself to be pretty proficient at whistling, though she rarely utilizes it. She's proficient enough in this area that she is able to implement vibrato, melismas and such into her whistles. Her whistle register stretches as far as B7.

Having seemingly unrivaled breath management technique, she is able to hold long musical phrases in one breath and can last for up to 42 seconds without visible struggle.

Her vocal agility is worthy of mention; As skillful as she is, Velarde is capable of flawlessly executing runs and riffs done in coloratura speeds (6 notes in .3 seconds, 11 notes in 1 second, 18 notes in 1.9 seconds). Arguably, not a lot of Filipino singers have such ability, reason why she is one of the very melismatic vocalists in the country today such as Kyla, Elaine Duran, Jay R.

One of her better known traits as a musician is her capacity to imitate the sound and vocal styles of various local and international artists such as Regine Velasquez, Zsa Zsa Padilla, Jaya, Jessie J,  Beyoncé, Christina Aguilera, Whitney Houston, Celine Dion, and Mariah Carey.

Discography

Studio Album

Singles

Concerts
SiKat Ako (February 1, 2019), New Frontier Theater
SiKat i2 (November 29, 2019), New Frontier Theater
Four Hearts: A Digital Concert (August 28, 2021)

Filmography

Television

As a group

As herself

References

External links
 
Katrina Velarde on Spotify 

Katrina Velarde on Apple Music

Katrina Velarde on YouTube

Singers with a five-octave vocal range
1994 births
Living people
21st-century Filipino actresses
21st-century Filipino singers